Pratik A. Shah is an American lawyer and current co-head of Akin Gump's Supreme Court and Appellate Practice. A graduate of Princeton University with highest honors in chemical engineering, and University of California, Berkeley, School of Law, Boalt Hall (class of 2001), Shah clerked for Judge William A. Fletcher of the U.S. Court of Appeals for the 9th Circuit and Stephen G. Breyer of the U.S. Supreme Court in the 2003 Term. Before joining Akin Gump, Shah argued 13 cases in front of the U.S. Supreme Court as an assistant to the Solicitor General, including United States v. Windsor, which made it unconstitutional to withhold federal recognition of same-sex marriages performed in states where it is legal.

See also 
 List of law clerks of the Supreme Court of the United States (Seat 2)

References

Princeton University alumni
United States Department of Justice lawyers
American legal scholars
UC Berkeley School of Law alumni
Law clerks of the Supreme Court of the United States
21st-century American lawyers
Lawyers from Washington, D.C.
American scholars of constitutional law
Living people
Year of birth missing (living people)